The men's 300 m rifle three positions was a shooting sports event held as part of the shooting at the 1912 Summer Olympics programme. It was the third appearance of the event, which had been introduced in 1900. The competition was held on Tuesday, 2 July 1912. Eighty-four sport shooters from nine nations competed. The event was won by Paul Colas of France, the nation's first medal in the event. Denmark took the silver and bronze medals, as Lars Jørgen Madsen (in his third time competing in the event) finished second and Niels Larsen placed third.

Background

This was the third appearance of the men's 300 metre three-positions rifle event, which was held 11 times between 1900 and 1972. Lars Jørgen Madsen of Denmark, who had taken fifth in 1900 and 14th in 1908, was competing once again. Other veterans of the 1908 Games competing again included the four Norwegians from the top 10 in 1908: gold medalist Albert Helgerud, bronze medalist Ole Sæther, sixth-place finisher Julius Braathe, and ninth-place finisher Olaf Sæther. Léon Johnson of France, the eighth-place finisher, also returned. None of the world champions competed.

Russia and South Africa made their debut in the event. Denmark, France, and Norway each made their third appearance, the only nations to have competed at every appearance of the event to date.

Competition format

The competition had each shooter fire 120 shots, 40 shots in each of three positions: prone, kneeling, and standing. The target was 1 metre in diameter, with 10 scoring rings; targets were set at a distance of 300 metres. Thus, the maximum score possible was 1200 points. Any rifle could be used, with an open fore sight and open back sight; any ammunition could be used. Ties were broken by hits on targets, then centre hits, then 10s, then 9s, etc.

Records

Prior to the competition, the existing world and Olympic records were as follows.

The top ten shooters in 1912 broke the Olympic record. Paul Colas ended with the new record, at 987 points.

Schedule

Results

References

External links
 
 

Shooting at the 1912 Summer Olympics
Men's 300m 3 positions